Frank Fitzgibbon is an Irish newspaper editor and journalist. He is one of the four founders of The Sunday Business Post in 1989. Fitzgibbon edited the Irish edition of The Sunday Times for 15 years from 2005 until 2020.
He worked as a freelance journalist and then editor of the Kevin Kelly's, monthly Irish Business Magazine before setting up the Sunday Business Post.
Fitzgibbon also worked for the Sunday Tribune, Business & Finance Magazine and as a presenter and reporter on current affairs for RTE Television. He worked as Business editor of The Sunday Times from 2002 until he succeeded Fiona McHugh.

The son of journalist and broadcaster Denis ('Din Joe') Fitzgibbon he is originally from Bancroft, Tallaght, Co. Dublin, he was educated at St Mary's College, Dublin.
He was appointed to the Press Council of Ireland in 2018.

References

Year of birth missing (living people)
Living people
Irish newspaper editors
Sunday Tribune people
Business Post people